the 2023 UNAF Women's Tournament was supposed to be the third edition of the UNAF Women's Tournament, the international football championship organized by UNAF for the women's national teams of North Africa. the tournament was originally scheduled to be hosted in Sousse, Tunisia before relocating to Egypt due to the Tunisian inability to host the tournament. and that will make it the first edition not to be held in Tunisia since the first edition in 2009.

UNAF decided to cancel this edition of the tournament on 15 January 2023, citing the low numbers of countries participating and low interest between members associations.

Morocco were the defending champions having won in 2020 unbeaten. Morocco withdrew before the cancelation of the tournament and therefore wouldn't have been able to defend their title.

Participating nations
Originally four teams Tunisia, Algeria, Morocco, and Egypt were supposed to participate in the 2023 UNAF women's tournament scheduled in Sousse, Tunisia. However, Tunisia decided to withdraw the right to host the competition. which led to the competition being relocated to Egpyt. automatically, Egypt was confirmed as the first participating nation. on 10 January 2023, Morocco announced its withdrawal from the competition citing the time schedule as they already have a number of foreign camps and tournaments against European teams they will be participating against as preparation for their 2023 FIFA Women's World Cup debut. Algeria who initially confirmed their participation, on 12 January confirmed their participation in the tournament. on 15 January Tunisia's non-participation became official as the Tunisian football federation declined participation due to lack of preparation as the team wasn't prepared to participate internationally.

After Morocco withdrew, UNAF tried to invite guest teams, mainly CECAFA members Tanzania who finished as runners-up in the previous edition and Kenya. Libya was reinvited to the tournament after initially declining participation.

Did not enter

 (76)
 (78)

Main Tournament
All times are local, CAT (UTC+2)

See also
 2023 WAFU Zone A Women's Cup

References

External links

UNAF Women's Tournament
2023 in African football
Arab
International association football competitions hosted by Egypt
UNAF Women's